The Artist as Hephaestus is a bronze statue by Sir Eduardo Paolozzi, created in 1987.

The sculpture was commissioned by London and Paris Property Group to decorate the façade of its new office building at 34–36 High Holborn in London, and displayed in a purpose-built niche from 1987 to late 2012.  It was removed by the building owner when the property was scheduled for refurbishment in 2012. The sculpture failed to sell at an auction at Bonhams in November 2012, but was sold to art dealer Wentworth Beaumont in 2014 for £110,500.

The sculpture is based on a bronze bust of Paolozzi made by Celia Scott for Charles Jencks in 1983.  Scott gave Paolozzi a plaster cast of the work (which Paolozzi donated to the Scottish National Gallery of Modern Art in 1998).

Paolozzi donated a full-sized plaster and polystyrene version of The Artist as Hephaestus to the National Portrait Gallery in 1990.

References
 Paolozzi public art up for grabs, Twentieth Century Society, 31 October 2012
 The Artist as Hephaestus, Bonhams, 14 November 2012
 The Artist as Hephaestus, Bonhams, 18 November 2014
 Art Sales: Modern British art finds its stride, The Telegraph, 25 November 2014
 Sir Eduardo Luigi Paolozzi (The Artist as Hephaestus), National Portrait Gallery
 Selfportrait with a Strange Machine, National Portrait Gallery
 Council's legal action threat in bid to retrieve 'public artwork' sculpture sold at auction for £140,000, Camden New Journal, 15 November 2012
 Eight Foot Bronze Self Portrait Of Sir Eduardo Paolozzi As Greek God Of Fire And Sculptors In Bonhams 20th Century British & Irish Art Sale, Antiques Information Services, 12 October 2012

External links
Life Size Statues

Bronze sculptures in the United Kingdom
1987 sculptures
Sculptures of men
Sculptures of classical mythology
Statues in London
Removed statues
British contemporary works of art